Weishui may refer to the following locations in China:

 Weishui, Hebei (微水镇), town in Jingxing County
 Weishui, Hubei (洈水镇), town in Songzi
 Wei River, known in history as Weishui (渭水; "Wei Water")
 Wei River (Xiang River) (沩水河), a tributary of the Xiang River